Off the Wall is an album by saxophonist Budd Johnson with trumpeter Joe Newman which was recorded in late 1964 and released on the Argo label.

Track listing
 "Off the Wall" (Budd Johnson) – 5:05
 "The Folks Who Live on the Hill" (Jerome Kern, Oscar Hammerstein II) – 5:17
 "Love Is the Sweetest Thing" (Ray Noble) – 7:24
 "Strange Music" (Robert Wright, George Forrest) – 3:57
 "Baubles, Bangles, & Beads" (Alexander Borodin, Wright, Forrest) – 6:05
 "Ill Wind" (Harold Arlen, Ted Koehler) – 5:04
 "Playin' My Hunch" (Johnson) – 5:09

Personnel
Budd Johnson – tenor saxophone
Joe Newman – trumpet
Albert Dailey – piano
Richard Davis (tracks 1, 2, 6 &  7), George Duvivier (tracks 3-5)  – bass
Grady Tate – drums

References

Budd Johnson albums
1965 albums
Argo Records albums
Albums produced by Esmond Edwards